Fire Away is the follow-up album to Ozomatli's 2007 studio release Don't Mess with the Dragon.

Track listing
"Are You Ready" - 3:18
"45" - 3:03
"It's Only Paper" (feat. Jack Johnson) - 2:47
"Elysian Persuasion" - 3:17
"Gay Vatos In Love" - 3:16
"Yeah Yeah Yeah Yeah" - 3:05
"It's Only Time" - 4:15
"Nadas Por Free" - 2:56
"Malagasy Shock" - 2:58
"Love Comes Down" - 5:29
"Caballito" - 2:12

DIGITAL DOWNLOAD BONUS TRACKS

"Vamonos En Tren" - 2:53
"La Meta" - 2:56
"All Around The World" - 3:12

References

External links
 Ozomatli Official Store
 Fire Away at Amazon.com

Ozomatli albums
2010 albums
Downtown Records albums